Bis is a fashion magazine directed at teenage women published in Japan by Kobunsha. The magazine is an affiliate of the magazine JJ.

History 
The magazine was first published in 2001 as JJ Bis, intended as a version of JJ for a younger audience. The magazine was renamed to Bis in 2006. Due to low sales, the magazine went out of print after the June 2006 edition, but was restarted in September 2017. , former editor of the magazine LARME, was named editor in chief.

External links

References

2001 establishments in Japan
Fashion magazines published in Japan
Kobunsha
Lifestyle magazines published in Japan
Magazines established in 2001
Magazines disestablished in 2006
Magazines established in 2017
Magazines published in Tokyo
Monthly magazines published in Japan
Teen magazines published in Japan
Women's fashion magazines
Women's magazines published in Japan